Series 4 of Top Gear, a British motoring magazine and factual television programme, was broadcast in the United Kingdom on BBC Two during 2004, consisting of ten episodes between 9 May and 1 August; a compilation episode featuring the best moments of the series, titled "Best of Top Gear", was aired on 8 August. This series saw the introduction of elements that would become a key part of the programme's formats, including races and special motoring budget challenges.

This series' highlights included an fuel endurance test between London and Edinburgh, the first major race between a car and public transport, and the presenters conducting their first budget car challenge. After the series concluded, a special edition for Sport Relief, titled "Stars in Fast Cars", was aired on 1 August, which later spawned a spin-off series for the BBC.

Episodes

Spin-Off Special

References

2004 British television seasons
Top Gear seasons